Z. robustus  may refer to:
 Zaglossus robustus, an extinct long-beaked echidna species from the Pleistocene of Tasmania
 an incorrect abbreviation of Zephyranthes robusta, the pink fairy lily, pink rain lily, pink zephyr lily or pink magic lily, a plant species native to North America

See also
 Robustus (disambiguation)